Criscia is a genus of South American flowering plants in the family Asteraceae.

Species
The only known species is Criscia stricta, native to Uruguay, Brazil (Rio Grande do Sul, Paraná), and Argentina (Buenos Aires, Misiones, Corrientes, Entre Ríos).

References

Monotypic Asteraceae genera
Nassauvieae
Flora of South America